Persian invasion may refer to:

 Persian invasion of Scythia, 513 BC
 Greco-Persian Wars
 First Persian invasion of Greece, 492–490 BC
 Second Persian invasion of Greece, 480–479 BC
 Persian Invasion of Daghestan, 1741–1743 AD